Ancylolomia taprobanensis, the Chocolate grass-moth is a moth in the family Crambidae. It was described by Zeller in 1863. It is found in Mozambique, India and Sri Lanka, as well as on Java.

References

Ancylolomia
Moths described in 1863
Moths of Africa
Moths of Asia